

Herman (died 1078) was a medieval cleric who served as the Bishop of Ramsbury and of Sherborne before and after the Norman conquest of England. In 1075, he oversaw their unification and translation to Salisbury (then at Old Sarum). He died before the completion of the new cathedral.

Herman was a native of Flanders (Lotharingia). As chaplain of Edward the Confessor, he was named Bishop of Ramsbury shortly after 22 April 1045. He visited Rome in 1050, where he attended a papal council with his fellow English bishop Ealdred. He was named abbot of Malmesbury Abbey by King Edward in 1055 and planned to move his seat there as well, apparently in the hope of increasing the income from his poor see. The king revoked this position after three days, however, when the monks and Earl Harold objected.

He returned three years later when the bishopric of Sherborne fell vacant; he was elected, faced no opposition from Earl Harold, and resumed administration of Ramsbury around 1058 or 1059. He later moved the see to the royal fortress at Salisbury. Approval for this translation and the unification of his sees was given at the council held at London between 1074 and 1075.

Herman was a patron of Goscelin of Saint-Bertin, a noted medieval historian and musician.

Herman died on 20 February 1078.

Notes

Citations

References

 
 British History Online Bishops of Salisbury accessed on 30 October 2007

External links
 

1078 deaths
Bishops of Ramsbury (ancient)
Bishops of Sherborne (ancient)
Bishops of Salisbury
Year of birth unknown
11th-century English Roman Catholic bishops